Sushanth Anumolu (born 18 March 1986), known professionally as Sushanth, is an Indian actor who works in Telugu films. Born into the Akkineni–Daggubati family, he made his acting debut with Kalidasu (2008).

Post a series of box office failures, Sushanth earned success with his portrayal of a software employee in Chi La Sow (2018). His highest grossing release came with Ala Vaikunthapurramuloo (2020). He made his web debut with Maa Neella Tank (2022).

Early life and background
Sushanth was born as Sushanth Anumolu on 18 March 1986 in Hyderabad. He is the son of Anumolu Sathya Bhushana Rao and Naga Susheela Akkineni. He is the grandson of Akkineni Nageswara Rao, who is his mother's father and the nephew of Nagarjuna. Actors Sumanth, Naga Chaitanya and Akhil Akkineni are his cousins.

Sushanth completed his schooling from Hyderabad Public School and completed his bachelor's degree in Electrical and Computer Engineering, from University of Illinois, Urbana-Champaign. He worked at United Technologies and Schlumberger as an Electrical Engineer before his acting career. Sushanth attended the Kreating Charakters Training School, Mumbai for a short acting cour along with his cousin Naga Chaitanya.

Career

Debut and early career (2008-2019)
Sushanth made his acting debut in 2008 with Kalidasu opposite Tamannaah. Telugucinema.com noted, "Sushanth makes a decent debut. He can become a good actor by honing his skills further." The film was a success at the box office. He then portrayed a college student in the 2009 film Current opposite Sneha Ullal. 123Telugu wrote, "Sushanth comes up with a decent performance except for the emotional scenes where he is limited."

Post a 3 year hiatus, Sushanth portrayed a man who creates rifts between couples in Adda, opposite Shanvi Srivastava. Times of India stated, "Sushanth carried himself well throughout the film, sticking to the characterisation. He’s got talent and he shows it off." He made a special appearance in the 2015 film Dongaata.

In 2016, he portrayed a NRI in Aatadukundam Raa opposite Sonam Bajwa. The New Indian Express said, "Sushanth neither looks the part nor acts it. It's an exaggerated performance and at no point do you feel like rooting for him."

Sushanth career marked a turning point in 2018. He portrayed a bachelor who does not want to get married, in Chi La Sow opposite Ruhani Sharma. The film was a box office success. India Today wrote, "Sushanth, who is yearning for a break in the industry, has finally got one in the form of this film." Deccan Chronicle noted, "Sushanth does full justice to his character Arjun. He is subtle, apt for the role and has done a fabulous job as he proves he can act."

Career progression (2020-present)
Sushanth portrayed a young businessman in the multi-starrer Ala Vaikunthapurramuloo, opposite Nivetha Pethuraj in 2020. It became one of the highest-grossing Telugu films of all time and one of the highest grossing Indian films of 2020. Hindustan Times said, "Sushant is wasted in a role that has no importance and it barely make any impact."

In 2021, he portrayed an architecture in Ichata Vahanamulu Niluparadu opposite Meenakshi Chaudhary. Pinkvilla stated, "Sushanth's character acquires a gravitas of its own in the pre-climax and climax." Times of India noted, "Sushanth is decent as Arun but it’s not his best work."

Sushanth made his web debut with the ZEE5 series Maa Neella Tank. He portrayed a Sub-Inspector opposite Priya Anand. Times of India noted, "Sushanth presented a different shade in his acting, portraying the character of a police inspector."

Sushanth will next portray the lead alongside Ravi Teja in Ravanasura, that will release in April 2023.

Filmography

Films

Web series

Awards and nominations

References

External links
 

Male actors in Telugu cinema
Indian male film actors
Living people
Male actors from Hyderabad, India
21st-century Indian male actors
Year of birth missing (living people)
Telugu male actors